Justinas Lagunavičius (September 4, 1924 – July 15, 1997) was a Lithuanian basketball player who competed for the Soviet Union in the 1952 Summer Olympics. He trained at VSS Žalgiris in Kaunas.

He was a member of the Soviet team, which won the Olympic silver medal in 1952. He played five matches.

References

External links
Profile

1924 births
1997 deaths
Basketball players from Kaunas
Lithuanian men's basketball players
Soviet men's basketball players
BC Žalgiris players
Olympic basketball players of the Soviet Union
Basketball players at the 1952 Summer Olympics
Olympic silver medalists for the Soviet Union
FIBA EuroBasket-winning players
Olympic medalists in basketball
Medalists at the 1952 Summer Olympics
Honoured Masters of Sport of the USSR
Lithuanian Sports University alumni